Quick Reads are a series of short books by bestselling authors and celebrities. With no more than 128 pages, they are designed to encourage adults who do not read often, or find reading difficult, to discover the joy of books.

Quick Reads are a collaboration amongst leading publishers, supermarkets, bookshops, libraries, government departments, the National Institute of Adult Continuing Education (NIACE), Arts Council England, the BBC, World Book Day, National Book Tokens and more. They are used as a resource for adult literacy teaching and have been used in Skills for Life and ESOL classes in colleges, community centres, libraries, prisons and workplaces across the country. They have also been used in hospitals, stroke recovery units, dyslexia centres, care homes, family learning groups, pre-schools, organisations working with homeless people and traveller communities, and Army and RAF bases. In a survey covering 50,000 new readers in 2010, 98% said that Quick Reads had made a positive impact on their lives.

In 2018, the program was due to come to an end because of a lack of funding. Jojo Moyes turned this situation around by offering the group an additional three years of funding.

History
Quick Reads were launched in the UK and Ireland by the then Prime Minister Tony Blair on World Book Day 2006. Through mid-2020, over 100 titles have been published, over 4.8 million copies have been sold and over 5 million copies have been loaned through libraries.

Featured authors have included Gordon Ramsay, Chris Ryan, Danny Wallace, Andy McNab, Ricky Tomlinson, John Simpson, Colin Jackson, Scott Quinnell, Adele Parks, Kerry Katona, Minette Walters, Joanna Trollope, Alvin Hall, and Rolf Harris. The initiative also features seven books based on the popular Doctor Who series. An incomplete list of titles can be found on the Quick Reads website.

Sale

Quick Reads are available from supermarkets, bookshops and online retailers for £1.99. They can also be ordered direct from publishers and wholesalers.

There are special offers for employers and for family reading breakfast organisers, and in 2010 the new titles were available as eBooks for the first time.

Wales
The project in Wales is also known as Quick Reads or Stori Sydyn in Welsh. Each year four books are published in Welsh, and four in English, by Welsh authors or celebrities. The campaign in Wales uses the same branding as the campaign in England, but it is bilingual. Funding for this comes from the Welsh National Assembly via Basic Skills Cymru, part of the National Basic Skills Strategy.

References

External links
Quick Reads Initiative Website
Quick Reads Initiative Wales
BBC Skillswise for Quick Reads audio recordings and downloads

British books
Programmes of the Government of the United Kingdom